Francisco Neto (28 September 1944 – 14 November 2014) was a Portuguese sports shooter. He competed in the men's 25 metre rapid fire pistol event at the 1984 Summer Olympics.

References

External links
 

1944 births
2014 deaths
Portuguese male sport shooters
Olympic shooters of Portugal
Shooters at the 1984 Summer Olympics
Place of birth missing